Brian Desmond Anthony Hannon' (5 October 1936 – 10 January 2022) was a Church of Ireland clergyman, who was Bishop of Clogher from 1986 to 2001. He was also the father of the singer and songwriter Neil Hannon, lead member of The Divine Comedy, who wrote the theme music for the situation comedy Father Ted''.

Hannon was educated at Trinity College, Dublin, and ordained in 1962. His first post was a curacy in Clooney, County Londonderry; after which he was the incumbent at Desertmartin, County Londonderry. He ministered in Derry, County Londonderry, from 1969 to 1982, during the time of The Troubles. He then moved to the Church of Ireland Diocese of Clogher, as rector of the Cathedral Parish of Enniskillen in County Fermanagh, and became Dean of Clogher in 1985. He was raised to the episcopate as Bishop of Clogher in 1986.

He retired on 5 October 2001, his sixty-fifth birthday. Hannon died on 10 January 2022, at the age of 85.

References 

1936 births
2022 deaths
Alumni of Trinity College Dublin
Anglican bishops in Northern Ireland
Bishops of Clogher (Church of Ireland)
Deans of Clogher